R. candida  may refer to:
 Rodriguezia candida, an orchid species found from northern South America to Brazil
 Ramularia candida, a synonym for Nectria ramulariae, a plant pathogenic fungus species

See also
 Candida (disambiguation)